Adrian Hall may refer to:

 Adrian Hall (artist) (born 1943), English artist
 Adrian Hall (actor) (born 1959), English actor
 Adrian Hall (director) (1927–2023), American theater director
 Adrian Hall (Home and Away), a fictional character from the soap opera Home and Away